Mercedes Socino (born 28 February 1990) is an Italian field hockey player for the Italian national team.

She participated at the 2018 Women's Hockey World Cup.

References

1990 births
Living people
Italian female field hockey players
Female field hockey midfielders
Expatriate field hockey players
Italian expatriate sportspeople in Argentina